David Munks (born 29 April 1947) is an English former footballer whose career ran from the mid-1960s to the mid-1970s. Born in Sheffield on 29 April 1947 Munks won two England Youth caps whilst with his first club Sheffield United . The following month he broke into the first team for the first time during a tour of New Zealand. In all Munks was to make over 100 appearances for The Blades before moving to Portsmouth in the 1969 close season. He was to prove such a popular player on the south coast that in 1971 he was awarded the title of Pompey's Player of the Year. Change, however, was afoot at Fratton Park  with  new chairman John Decon sanctioning the purchase of talented new defenders Paul Went and Malcolm Manley. Costs soon spiralled and Munks was one of the first of a cluster of players to leave to offset the huge new wage bills. In  December 1973 he signed for a relegation threatened  Swindon but was used inexplicably as a midfielder. Not surprisingly this tactical experiment did not enhance a poor side and he was released at the end of the season when they were finally relegated. Initially loaned to Exeter in the summer of 1974 he signed for the Grecians on a permanent basis in December of that year. However, his league career was ended with a knee injury the following year and in 1976 he left the game.

References

1947 births
Living people
Footballers from Sheffield
Sheffield United F.C. players
Portsmouth F.C. players
Swindon Town F.C. players
Exeter City F.C. players
Waterlooville F.C. players
England youth international footballers
Association football defenders
English footballers